Mellars is a surname. Notable people with this surname include: 
Charmian Mellars (born 1979), New Zealand professional basketball player
Sir Paul Mellars (1939–2022), British archaeologist, professor of prehistory and human evolution at the University of Cambridge
Peter Mellars, New Zealand rugby league footballer and administrator
Vince Mellars (born 1984), New Zealand rugby league and rugby union footballer

See also
Tamás Mellár (born 1954), Hungarian economist, statistician, professor and politician